Dave Morgan may refer to:

 Dave Morgan (footballer) (born 1930), Australian footballer for Collingwood
 Dave Morgan (musician) (born 1942), British musician
 Dave Morgan (racing driver) (1944–2018), British former racing driver
 Dave Morgan (weightlifter) (born 1964), weightlifter from Wales

See also
 David Morgan (disambiguation)